Eren Vurdem (born 7 October 1988) is a Turkish actor.

Life and career 
Vurdem was born in 1988 in Konya and is a graduate of Haliç University Conservatory with a degree in theatre studies. He made his television debut in 2009 with the TV series Hesaplaşma and continued his career with supporting roles in the series İnadına Aşk, Şubat and Şefkat Tepe. His breakthrough came with his role in İnadına Aşk, where he portrayed the character of Çınar, and in Söz, where he played the role of Ateş Acar. Vurdem further rose to prominence by portraying Konur Alp in the historical drama Kuruluş: Osman. Between 2020 and 2021, he was a regular on Sadakatsiz, an adaptation of Doctor Foster.

Filmography

References

External links 
 
 

Living people
1988 births
Turkish male film actors
Turkish male television actors
21st-century Turkish male actors